Take On the World may refer to:

"Take On the World" (Judas Priest song)
"Take On the World" (Pseudo Echo song)